Henri Lepage (12 February 1898 – 31 January 1970) was a French film director, screenwriter, and  assistant director

Filmography

Codirector 
1924 : La Machine à refaire la vie, codirector Julien Duvivier (silent version)
1929 : Figaro by Gaston Ravel
1932 : Fun in the Barracks, codirector Maurice Tourneur 
1933 : La Machine à refaire la vie, codirector Julien Duvivier (sound version)
1945 : Marie la Misère, assistant-director Jacques de Baroncelli 
1947 : Monsieur Badin by Georges Régnier
1947 : Bichon by René Jayet
1949 : Nous avons tous fait la même chose by René Sti 
1951 : Fortuné de Marseille, codirector Pierre Méré

Director 
1925 : Une Aventure de la rue
1942 : Le Cinématographe Lumière (short film, documentary)
1949 : L'Extravagante Théodora
1950 : Mon ami le cambrioleur
1951 : Les Maîtres nageurs
1951 : Et ta sœur
1951 : Sins of Madeleine
1952 : Rires de Paris
1952 : Naked in the Wind
1954 : Le Collège en folie
1954 : Pas de souris dans le bizness
1955 : Pas de pitié pour les caves
1955 : In the Manner of Sherlock Holmes 
1956 : C'est une fille de Paname
1957 : Pas de grisbi pour Ricardo
1957 : Le Souffle du désir

Screenwriter 
1951 : Les Maîtres nageurs
1952 : Dupont Barbès
1952 : Fortuné de Marseille
1953 : L'Île aux femmes nues
1956 : À la manière de Sherlock Holmes

External links 
 Filmographie de Henri Lepage
 Réalisateur et scénariste Henri Lepage
 

Silent film directors
20th-century French screenwriters
Film directors from Paris
1898 births
1970 deaths